The Lynyrd Skynyrd Tribute Tour was a tour that was undertaken to pay tribute to the original band members who died in a plane crash in 1977.  The tour began in the fall of 1987, in honor of the 10-year anniversary of the plane crash.  A number of surviving members reunited for the tour.  Original members Gary Rossington, Billy Powell and Leon Wilkeson were joined by Ed King (original member who had left the band in 1975), Artimus Pyle (drummer at the time of the plane crash), Randall Hall and Johnny Van Zant.

History
Rossington, who had formed the original band with lead singer Ronnie Van Zant was initially reluctant to do the tour.  He was, in the words of his wife Dale Krantz-Rossington, still "very emotional" about the preceding events and about the anniversary of the plane crash.  Eventually, Rossington decided that if the tour was to be done right, and if his fallen colleagues were to be honored properly, that he should be involved.

Original guitarist and founding member, Allen Collins, was unable to play as a result of being paralyzed in a car crash in 1986.  Collins served as musical director for the tour, picking setlists and making cameo appearances onstage.  He chose former bandmate Randall Hall (who had played with Collins in the Allen Collins Band) to take his spot.

Ronnie Van Zant's youngest brother, Johnny, was chosen to assume the role of lead vocalist.  Other candidates were considered, including Paul Rodgers (of Free and Bad Company fame).  Ronnie had been a huge Paul Rodgers fan and even owned a boat named "Bad Company" at one point.  Ultimately though, it was Johnny who was deemed to be the best replacement for his brother.

The first leg of the tour was enormously successful.  Moved by the loyalty and reaction of the fans, the band elected to add a second leg (which ran through the summer of 1988).  The Tribute Tour Band played an inspired selection of classic Skynyrd tunes and ended the show with a heart-wrenching instrumental version of Free Bird.

The Rossington Band opened for the entire tour, playing a mixture of Rossington band original material and earlier material from the Rossington/Collins Band era.  Dale Krantz-Rossington sang lead vocals for the Rossington Band and backup vocals for the Skynyrd set.  Between the Rossington Band set and the Skynyrd set, old videos of the original Skynyrd band were shown on the bigscreen featuring full length versions of such songs as "T for Texas", "Don't Ask Me No Questions", "Cry for the Bad Man" and "Whiskey Rock-A-Roller".

Typical setlist
 Workin' for MCA
 I Ain't the One
 Saturday Night Special
 The Needle and the Spoon
 That Smell
 I Know a Little
 Gimme Three Steps
 Call Me the Breeze
 Swamp Music
 You Got That Right
 What's Your Name
 Gimme Back My Bullets
 Simple Man
 Sweet Home Alabama
 Free Bird

Tour dates

Personnel
 Johnny Van Zant – vocals
 Gary Rossington – guitars
 Ed King   – guitars
 Randall Hall   – guitars
 Billy Powell – keyboards
 Leon Wilkeson – bass
 Artimus Pyle – drums

References

External links
Chrome Oxide Skynyrd Set List

1987 concert tours
1988 concert tours
Lynyrd Skynyrd concert tours